Karen Spencer Marston (born 1968) is a United States district judge of the United States District Court for the Eastern District of Pennsylvania.

Education 

Marston earned her Bachelor of Arts from Davidson College and her Juris Doctor, magna cum laude, from Wake Forest University School of Law, where she served as an Articles Editor on the Wake Forest Law Review.

Legal and teaching career 

Marston previously served as an Assistant United States Attorney in the United States Attorney's Office for the Western District of North Carolina, receiving the Department of Justice Director's Award in 2002. From 2010 to 2019, she served as an Assistant United States Attorney in the United States Attorney's Office for the Eastern District of Pennsylvania, where she was the Chief of the Office's Narcotics and Organized Crime section. She has also served as an adjunct professor at Temple University Beasley School of Law.

Federal judicial service 

On August 14, 2019, President Donald Trump announced his intent to nominate Marston to serve as a United States district judge for the United States District Court for the Eastern District of Pennsylvania. On September 9, 2019, her nomination was sent to the Senate. President Trump nominated Marston to the seat vacated by Judge Legrome D. Davis, who assumed senior status on September 28, 2017. Her nomination was praised by both Senators Bob Casey Jr. and Pat Toomey. On September 11, 2019, a hearing on her nomination was held before the Senate Judiciary Committee. On October 24, 2019, her nomination was reported out of committee by a 19–3 vote. On December 18, 2019, the United States Senate invoked cloture on her nomination by a 85–7 vote. On December 19, 2019, her nomination was confirmed by a 87–6 vote. She received her judicial commission on December 20, 2019.

Memberships 

She has been a member of the Federalist Society since 2019.

References

External links 

1968 births
Living people
21st-century American judges
21st-century American lawyers
Assistant United States Attorneys
Davidson College alumni
Federalist Society members
Judges of the United States District Court for the Eastern District of Pennsylvania
People from Portsmouth, Virginia
Temple University faculty
United States district court judges appointed by Donald Trump
Wake Forest University School of Law alumni
21st-century American women lawyers
21st-century American women judges